Uwe Kockisch (born 31 January 1944) in Cottbus, Germany) is a German stage, screen and television actor.

Career
Kockisch completed his training to become an actor at the Ernst Busch Academy of Dramatic Arts in Berlin. He accepted engagements in Cottbus and Karl-Marx-Stadt (Chemnitz). He appeared in plays at the Maxim Gorki Theater for over 20 years and later, for two years, at the Schaubühne in Berlin.

Kockisch began working in the film industry in 1974.  In 1981, he played the lead role in Dein unbekannter Bruder (Your Unknown Brother), available at Netflix, an East German film by Ulrich Weiss.  Kockisch appeared in such crime series as Tatort and  Polizeiruf 110, and played an inspector in the TV series Zappek.  Since 2003 he has incarnated Commissario Guido Brunetti  in a number of television films based on the crime novels by Donna Leon.  In 2010 he held one of the lead roles in the six-part miniseries The Weissensee Saga: A Berlin Love Story, as the Stasi officer Hans Kupfer.

Personal life
As a youth, Kockisch attempted to escape from East Germany, but was caught and had to spend a year in prison.

Kockisch is married and lives in Madrid.

Awards 

 2008: Uwe Kockisch received the Adolf Grimme Award for Best Lead Actor in the "Fiction" category, for his role in the movie A City Is Blackmailed by Dominik Graf.
 2011: Deutscher Fernsehpreis representing the actors for the six-part miniseries The Weissensee Saga: A Berlin Love Story.

Selected filmography 

 1973: Erziehung vor Verdun. Der große Krieg der weißen Männer (Education before Verdun)
 1975: Für die Liebe noch zu mager
 1975: Die schwarze Mühle (TV)
 1978: Unser Drache Kasimir (TV)
 1978: Marx und Engels – Stationen ihres Lebens (TV series)
 1979: Lachtauben weinen nicht
 1981: Unser kurzes Leben (Our Short Life)
 1981: Bürgschaft für ein Jahr 
 1982: Dein unbekannter Bruder (Your Unknown Brother)
 1982: Sabine Kleist, 7 Jahre… (Sabine Kleist, Aged Seven...)
 1984: Die Zeit der Einsamkeit
 1985: Erscheinen Pflicht
 1986: Rabenvater
 1988: Treffen in Travers
 1990: Grönland
 1992:  
 1992: Miraculi
 1994: : Die Narbe des Himmels (TV)
 1995: Operation Medusa (TV)
 1995–1996: Zappek (TV series)
 1996: Polizeiruf 110 - Kurzer Traum (TV episode)
 1997: Berlin – Moskau (TV)
 1997: Rosamunde Pilcher - Stunde der Entscheidung (TV episode)
 1998: The Big Mambo
 1998: Abgehauen (TV)
 1998: Unsere Kinder! - Verschollen im Urlaub (TV)
 1999: Gestern ist nie vorbei (TV)
 1999-2000: Der Clown (TV series)
 2000: Rosa Roth - Tod eines Bullen (TV episode)
 2001: Polizeiruf 110 - Bei Klingelzeichen Mord (TV episode)
 2001: Opferlamm - Zwischen Liebe und Haß (TV)
 2001: Female 2 Seeks Happy End (TV)
 2001: The Tunnel
 2001: Tatort - Kalte Wut (TV episode)
 2002: Rotlicht - Die Stunde des Jägers (TV)
 2004: Kleinruppin forever
 2004: Carola Stern's Double Life (TV)
 2006: Endloser Horizont (TV)
 2005: Erinnere dich, wenn du kannst! (TV)
 2005:  (TV)
 2006: A City Is Blackmailed (TV)
 2006: The Eagle - Codename: Minos (TV episode)
 2006: The Eagle - Codename: Ithaka (TV episode)
 2007: Unter Verdacht – Das Geld anderer Leute (TV episode)
 2007:  (TV)
 2008: Wenn wir uns begegnen (TV)
 2008: Eine Nacht im Grandhotel (A Night at the Grand Hotel) (TV) 
 2008: Schattenwelt (Long Shadows)
 2009: Ein Dorf schweigt (TV)
 2009:  –  (TV episode)
 2009: Hoffnung für Kummerow (TV)
 2009: Lutter - Mordshunger (TV episode)
 2010:  (TV)
 2010: The Weissensee Saga: A Berlin Love Story (TV mini-series)
 2010: Morgen musst Du sterben (TV)
 2011: The Gold Quest: A Journey to Panama (TV)
 2011: Spreewaldkrimi – Die Tränen der Fische, Regie (TV)
 2011: Jorinde und Joringel (TV)
 2011: Die Besucher
 2013: Ruby Red

Donna Leon Series 

As Commissario Guido Brunetti, Kockisch has appeared in the following television films based on the crime novels by Donna Leon:

 2003: ep 5 - Venezianisches Finale (Death at La Fenice) - Director: Sigi Rothemund
 2003: ep 6 - Feine Freunde (Friends in High Places) - Director: Sigi Rothemund 
 2004: ep 7 - Sanft entschlafen (The Death of Faith – aka Quietly in Their Sleep) - Director: Sigi Rothemund
 2004: ep 8 - Acqua alta (Acqua alta – aka Death in High Water) - Director: Sigi Rothemund
 2005: ep 9 - Beweise, dass es böse ist (Doctored Evidence) - Director: Sigi Rothemund
 2005: ep 10 - Verschwiegene Kanäle (Uniform Justice) - Director: Sigi Rothemund
 2006: ep 11 - Endstation Venedig (Death in a Strange Country) - Director: Sigi Rothemund
 2006: ep 12 - Das Gesetz der Lagune (A Sea of Troubles) - Director: Sigi Rothemund
 2008: ep 13 - Die dunkle Stunde der Serenissima (Wilful Behavior) - Director: Sigi Rothemund
 2008: ep 14 - Blutige Steine (Blood from a Stone) - Director: Sigi Rothemund
 2009: ep 15 - Wie durch ein dunkles Glas (Through a Glass, Darkly) - Director: Sigi Rothemund
 2010: ep 16 - Lasset die Kinder zu mir kommen (Suffer the Little Children) - Director: Sigi Rothemund
 2011: ep 17 - Das Mädchen seiner Träume (The Girl of His Dreams) - Director: Sigi Rothemund
 2012: ep 18 - Schöner Schein (About Face) - Director: Sigi Rothemund
 2013: ep 19 - Auf Treu und Glauben (A Question of Belief) - Director: Sigi Rothemund

References

External links 
 
 Friedrichshainer Chronik biography
 Uwe Kockisch promotional pictures
 
 Donna Leon bestsellers with Uwe Kokisch as main character
 IMDB Commissario Brunetti character

1944 births
Living people
People from Cottbus
People from the Province of Brandenburg
East German actors
German male stage actors
German male film actors
German male television actors